Firefly and Live! is a compilation album by the Norwegian hard rock band TNT.

The first eight tracks on the album are taken from the studio album Firefly, while the rest of the tracks are taken from the live album Three Nights in Tokyo. "Angels Ride" and "Heaven's Gone" are not on this album as they were declared offensive by the label..

Track listing

Personnel

Band
 Tony Harnell – vocals
 Ronni Le Tekrø – guitars, lead vocals on "Moonflower"
 Morty Black – bass guitar

Associated members
 Dag Stokke – keyboards
 Frode Lamøy – drums, percussion on studio tracks (credited as Frode Hansen)
 John Macaluso – drums, percussion on "Soldier of the Light" and live tracks

Additional personnel
 Embee Normann – flute, background vocals on "Moonflower"

Sources
https://www.amazon.com/dp/B00000108Z
https://web.archive.org/web/20061225155616/http://richweb.allpar.net/TNT.htm

1997 compilation albums
TNT (Norwegian band) albums